The Lady Errol Classic was a golf tournament on the LPGA Tour from 1972 to 1974. It was founded by Joan Majors with help from her neighbor Martha Rayborn.  Majors lived in Winter Park, Florida with her husband John, and three children, Kathy, Diana and Gary.  The golf tournament was played at the Errol Estates Country Club in Apopka, Florida.  When Majors' husband was transferred to Columbia, South Carolina, she was unable to direct the tournament and it ceased to continue.

Winners
1974 Jane Blalock
1973 Kathy Whitworth
1972 Jane Blalock

References

Former LPGA Tour events
Golf in Florida
Recurring sporting events established in 1972
Recurring sporting events disestablished in 1974
1972 establishments in Florida
1974 disestablishments in Florida
Apopka, Florida
Women's sports in Florida